Laurence John "Laurie" Failes (6 October 1899 – 7 July 1976) was an Australian politician. Born in Coonabarabran, New South Wales, he attended state schools and then Hawkesbury Agricultural College before becoming a farmer at Bugaldie and then a businessman at Coonabarabran. He served in World War II 1942–45.

In 1949, he was elected to the Australian House of Representatives as the Country Party member for Lawson. He was a member of the Joint Parliamentary Committee on Foreign Affairs, the House Committee and the Select Committee on the House of Representatives Accommodation.

He held Lawson until its abolition in 1969, at which time he retired. Failes died in 1976.

References

National Party of Australia members of the Parliament of Australia
Members of the Australian House of Representatives for Lawson
Members of the Australian House of Representatives
1899 births
1976 deaths
20th-century Australian politicians